Eric Todd Piatkowski (born September 30, 1970) is an American former professional basketball player in the National Basketball Association (NBA). He played college basketball for the Nebraska Cornhuskers. He is the son of former ABA player Walt Piatkowski.

High school career
Piatkowski attended Rapid City Stevens High School and was a student and a standout in basketball. In basketball, as a senior, he led his team to the 1989 South Dakota Class AA State Championship, was an All-State selection, and was named the Mr. Basketball for the State of South Dakota.

College career
Piatkowski played at the University of Nebraska–Lincoln for coach Danny Nee from 1990 to 1994. He was a member of the All Big Eight Freshman team in 1991 and was honorable mention All Big Eight his freshman and sophomore seasons. Piatkowski was a first team All-Big Eight pick by the Associated Press his junior year and averaged a team high 16.7 points per game.  He averaged 21.5 points per game his senior season and was named to the All Big Eight team again. He also led the Cornhuskers to the Big Eight Conference Tournament Championship game while scoring a collegiate high and NU single game record 42 points against Oklahoma in the semi-finals. They went on to defeat Oklahoma State in the finals and he secured tournament MVP honors.  That helped earn them the sixth seed in the NCAA Tournament.  However Piatkowski's team lost to the eleventh seeded Penn Quakers in the opening round. He was recognized as an honorable mention All-American by the Associated Press and finished his collegiate career with 1,934 career points, behind only Dave Hoppen for the most in school history. His jersey at Nebraska (No. 52) was retired in 2006.

NBA career
After completing his eligibility at the University of Nebraska-Lincoln, Piatkowski was drafted by the Indiana Pacers with the 15th pick of the 1994 NBA Draft. The Pacers immediately dealt his draft rights, along with Jerome Richardson and Malik Sealy, to the Los Angeles Clippers for Mark Jackson and the draft rights to Greg Minor.  He ended his Clipper career as the franchise leader in games played (616), 3-point field goals made (738) and 3-point field goal attempts (1,835) and free throw percentage (.880%).

After nine seasons with the Clippers he signed as an unrestricted free agent with the Houston Rockets before the 2003-04 season. Piatkowski became a Bull on September 8, 2004, when Houston sent him, Adrian Griffin and Mike Wilks to Chicago in exchange for Dikembe Mutombo.
On July 13, 2006, Piatkowski officially signed with the Phoenix Suns, agreeing on a two-year, $2.4 million deal. In April 2014 Piatkowski's group was attempting to buy the L.A. Clippers from embattled owner Donald T Sterling, before Steve Ballmer bought the team outright.

Career highlights and trivia
He played for the US in the World Basketball games in 1993.
On February 16, 2002, he set a career high of 36 points against the Dallas Mavericks.
He set the Clippers individual season record for three-point percentage at .466 which ranked him third in the NBA that season. (2001-02)
Nicknamed "Pike" and "The Polish Rifle" for his surname and three-point shooting accuracy.
The first third generation pro basketball player, his dad Walt played four seasons, and grandad Joe played in the 1950s.
Holds three L.A. Clippers all time records, free throw percentage, three point shooting percentage and most games played for the franchise in L.A.
Had his number 52 retired by the University of Nebraska.
Beginning in the 2008-2009 season, Piatkowski became the color analyst on Fox Sports Midwest for the Nebraska men's basketball team.

NBA career statistics

Regular season 

|-
| align="left" | 
| align="left" | L.A. Clippers
| 81 || 11 || 14.9 || .441 || .374 || .783 || 1.6 || 1.0 || .5 || .2 || 7.0
|-
| align="left" | 
| align="left" | L.A. Clippers
| 65 || 1 || 12.1 || .405 || .333 || .817 || 1.6 || .7 || .4 || .2 || 4.6
|-
| align="left" | 
| align="left" | L.A. Clippers
| 65 || 0 || 11.5 || .450 || .425 || .821 || 1.6 || .8 || .5 || .2 || 6.0
|-
| align="left" | 
| align="left" | L.A. Clippers
| 67 || 35 || 26.0 || .452 || .409 || .824 || 3.5 || 1.3 || .8 || .2 || 11.3
|-
| align="left" | 
| align="left" | L.A. Clippers
| 49 || 38 || 25.3 || .432 || .394 || .863 || 2.9 || 1.1 || .9 || .1 || 10.5
|-
| align="left" | 
| align="left" | L.A. Clippers
| 75 || 23 || 22.8 || .415 || .383 || .850 || 3.0 || 1.1 || .6 || .2 || 8.7
|-
| align="left" | 
| align="left" | L.A. Clippers
| 81 || 40 || 26.5 || .433 || .404 || .873 || 3.0 || 1.2 || .6 || .2 || 10.6
|-
| align="left" | 
| align="left" | L.A. Clippers
| 71 || 64 || 24.2 || .439 || .466 || .894 || 2.6 || 1.6 || .6 || .2 || 8.8
|-
| align="left" | 
| align="left" | L.A. Clippers
| 62 || 26 || 21.9 || .471 || .398 || .828 || 2.5 || 1.1 || .5 || .1 || 9.7
|-
| align="left" | 
| align="left" | Houston
| 49 || 0 || 14.3 || .377 || .352 || .875 || 1.5 || .5 || .3 || .1 || 4.1
|-
| align="left" | 
| align="left" | Chicago
| 68 || 11 || 12.4 || .430 || .425 || .804 || 1.2 || .8 || .4 || .0 || 4.8
|-
| align="left" | 
| align="left" | Chicago
| 29 || 1 || 7.9 || .393 || .273 || .400 || .8 || .4 || .2 || .0 || 2.0
|-
| align="left" | 
| align="left" | Phoenix
| 11 || 0 || 6.6 || .360 || .389 || 1.000 || .8 || .4 || .0 || .1 || 2.5
|-
| align="left" | 
| align="left" | Phoenix
| 16 || 0 || 7.1 || .364 || .423 || 1.000 || .8 || .6 || .0 || .1 || 2.4
|- class="sortbottom"
| style="text-align:center;" colspan="2"| Career
| 789 || 250 || 18.5 || .434 || .399 || .839 || 2.2 || 1.0 || .5 || .1 || 7.5

Playoffs 

|-
| align="left" | 1997
| align="left" | L.A. Clippers
| 3 || 0 || 12.7 || .364 || .400 || .857 || .7 || .0 || .3 || .0 || 5.3
|-
| align="left" | 2004
| align="left" | Houston
| 1 || 0 || 4.0 || .000 || .000 || .000 || 1.0 || .0 || .0 || .0 || .0
|-
| align="left" | 2005
| align="left" | Chicago
| 5 || 0 || 13.2 || .316 || .385 || .857 || 1.8 || .6 || .8 || .2 || 4.6
|-
| align="left" | 2006
| align="left" | Chicago
| 6 || 0 || 4.7 || .500 || .400 || 1.000 || .8 || .2 || .0 || .2 || 1.7
|-
| align="left" | 2007
| align="left" | Phoenix
| 1 || 0 || 3.0 || 1.000 || .000 || .000 || .0 || .0 || .0 || .0 || 2.0
|-
| align="left" | 2008
| align="left" | Phoenix
| 1 || 0 || 2.0 || .000 || .000 || .000 || .0 || .0 || .0 || .0 || .0
|- class="sortbottom"
| style="text-align:center;" colspan="2"| Career
| 17 || 0 || 8.3 || .368 || .391 || .875 || 1.0 || .2 || .3 || .1 || 3.0

Notes

External links
 
 ESPN.com Profile - Eric Piatkowski

1970 births
Living people
American men's basketball players
American people of Polish descent
Basketball players from Ohio
Basketball players from South Dakota
Chicago Bulls players
Houston Rockets players
Indiana Pacers draft picks
Los Angeles Clippers players
Medalists at the 1993 Summer Universiade
Nebraska Cornhuskers men's basketball players
Phoenix Suns players
Shooting guards
Small forwards
Sportspeople from Rapid City, South Dakota
Sportspeople from Steubenville, Ohio
Universiade gold medalists for the United States
Universiade medalists in basketball